"Johnny One Note" is a 1937 show tune from the 1937 Rodgers and Hart musical Babes in Arms, where it was introduced by Wynn Murray.  Judy Garland sang it in the Rodgers & Hart biopic Words and Music (1948).

Popular recordings in 1937 were by Hal Kemp & His Orchestra (vocal by Skinnay Ennis) and by Victor Young and His Orchestra (vocal by Bobby Dolan).

Other notable recordings
Judy Garland – single release for MGM Records (catalog No. 30172) b/ I Wish I Were in Love Again (1948).
Mary Martin - included in the album Babes in Arms (1951).
Blossom Dearie – for her album Blossom Dearie (1956)
Ella Fitzgerald – Ella Fitzgerald Sings the Rodgers & Hart Songbook (1956)
Chris Connor – for her album Chris Craft (1958). Later included in Jazz Date with Chris Connor (1999)
Eydie Gorme - Gormé Sings Showstoppers (1959).
Ethel Azama with the Marty Paich Orchestra (1959)
Johnny Mathis for his album Live It Up! (1961)
Anita O'Day – Anita O'Day and Billy May Swing Rodgers and Hart (1960)
Carol Burnett – Carol Burnett Remembers How They Stopped the Show (1961).
Shirley Bassey - I've Got a Song for You (1966)
The Supremes – The Supremes Sing Rodgers & Hart: The Complete Recordings (2002) – recorded during sessions for the original 1967 LP and included as a bonus track on the 2002 CD
Ted Heath – Big Band Percussion (1968) – an instrumental version, the first eight bars of which were used for many years as the opening theme to BBC1's children's news programme John Craven's Newsround
Barbra Streisand (in a medley with "One Note Samba") – Barbra Streisand... and Other Musical Instruments (1973)

References

Songs with music by Richard Rodgers
Songs with lyrics by Lorenz Hart
1937 songs
Songs from Babes in Arms
Barbra Streisand songs
Judy Garland songs